William Fourkiller (born February 26, 1972) is an American politician who served in the Oklahoma House of Representatives from the 86th district from 2010 to 2018. He is a member of the Cherokee Nation.

References

1972 births
Living people
Cherokee Nation state legislators in Oklahoma
Democratic Party members of the Oklahoma House of Representatives
20th-century Native Americans
21st-century Native American politicians